Luce Caponegro (born 17 December 1966), also known by her stage name Selen, is an Italian actress, TV presenter, and former pornographic actress.

Early life
Caponegro's father was an Italian industrialist active in the petroleum industry. She attended courses in singing, classical dance, and horseback riding as a child. After leaving home and marrying at the age of 18, she lived in a commune without running water or heating until the age of 20. In addition to Italian, she also speaks French and English.

Career as a porn star
In her early twenties, she first ventured into the adult industry with her first amateur hardcore video "Orgia di natale" directed by Cesare Geromini. 

Her breakthrough came in 1993 at the age of 27 when the director Alex Perry offered her a role in the film Signore scandalose di provincia. It is around this time she adopted the stage name Selen.

She has been called Italy's favorite porn star. She made appearances at the Hot D'Or pornographic festival in Cannes and Erotica in Turin and won 17 prizes during her career as a famous pornographic actress from 1993 to 1999.

Her last hardcore scenes were released in 2000 with the film Millennium. Although her last sex scene was filmed in 1999, she continued to appear afterward in films as clips were used in later hardcore films. 

She has stated that she would not return to pornography in the future.

Directors
Selen starred in films by such well-known Italian porn directors including Mario Salieri, known for Dracula, Sceneggiata napoletana, Concetta Licata; Silvio Bandinelli, known for Il rosso e il nero, Cuore di pietra); and Joe D'Amato, known for Selvaggia, Sahara, Selen regina degli elefanti. She played the title role in Cindy, directed by Luca Damiano.

Mainstream career

Caponegro has given no international interviews and has had a number of small roles in films and mainstream television. 

Caponegro has presented the music programme "Hot". She has made appearances in radio, hosting the show Lezioni di sesso (Sex Lessons). Caponegro has also participated in theatre and advertisements. In 2004, she starred in the reality show La Fattoria. She has also appeared in Maurizio Costanzo Show, Uno Mattina, Domenica In, I Fatti Vostri, and Omnibus.

Caponegro has attended the Palme D'Or film festival in Cannes as a mainstream actress; some of her films have been shown at the festival.

Caponegro had a small part in Asia Argento's film Scarlet Diva, which won a Williamsburg Brooklyn Film Festival Award for Best New Director.

Personal life
Caponegro has always lived in coastal Romagna. She has two sons, the first of whom, Kangi, was born in 1988 during her marriage with Fabio Albonetti, which has since ended in divorce. Her second son, Gabriele, was born in 2006 from her ex-partner Nicola Zanone. She is an animal-lover. In 2006, she graduated her school and expressed a desire to enroll at a university.

References

External links
 
 
 
 

1966 births
Living people
Italian pornographic film actresses
Italian film actresses
Participants in Italian reality television series